The Genetic Non-Discrimination Act of 2017, also known as Bill S-201 during the 2nd Session of the 41st Parliament of Canada and the 1st Session of the 42nd Parliament of Canada, originated in a Private Member's Bill. It was introduced by Senators James Cowan and Jennifer O'Connell. The Act was designed to prevent, on the basis of genetics, discrimination which might "come in the form of unfair insurance practices, being passed over for a promotion, and even being fired. Unfortunately, there are a number of documented cases of genetic discrimination in Canada."

Content and interpretation
The Act has heads of Interpretation and Prohibitions and Offences and Punishment. The contravening party can be punished by up to a $1,000,000 fine and by up to a five-year prison sentence.

The definition of a genetic test by this legislation is "a test that analyzes DNA, RNA or chromosomes for purposes such as the prediction of disease or vertical transmission risks, or monitoring, diagnosis or prognosis."

In the media
The Globe and Mail published an opinion piece upon passage of the Act in 2017 by their in-house healthcare analyst André Picard in which he said the "Anti-genetic-discrimination bill is little more than virtue signalling".

In the Supreme Court
In spring 2020, the Supreme Court of Canada upheld the law by a 5-4 margin, in a case originating when in 2018 the Attorney-General of Quebec asked the province's Court of Appeal to overturn the law because he held that it was an invalid expression of the exclusive federal power under s. 91(27) of the Constitution Act 1867 to regulate criminal matters.

References

Canadian federal legislation
41st Canadian Parliament
42nd Canadian Parliament
Canadian criminal law
2017 in Canadian law
Supreme Court of Canada cases
2020 in Canadian case law
Canadian civil rights case law
Minority rights case law
Canadian federal government litigation
Canadian constitutional case law